Stefan Tsonkov (born 24 January 1995) is a Bulgarian footballer who currently plays as a defender for Hebar Pazardzhik on loan from CSKA 1948.

References

External links

Living people
1995 births
People from Karlovo
Bulgarian footballers
Association football defenders
Vyzas F.C. players
FC Lokomotiv Gorna Oryahovitsa players
FC Montana players
First Professional Football League (Bulgaria) players
Second Professional Football League (Bulgaria) players
Bulgarian expatriate footballers
Bulgarian expatriate sportspeople in Greece
Expatriate footballers in Greece